The Battle of Elixheim, 18 July 1705, also known as the Passage of the Lines of Brabant was a battle of the War of the Spanish Succession.  The Duke of Marlborough successfully broke through the French Lines of Brabant, an arc of defensive fieldworks stretching in a seventy-mile arc from Antwerp to Namur. Although he was unable to bring about a decisive battle, the breaking and subsequent razing of the lines would prove critical to the allied victory at Ramillies the next year.

Prelude
Early in the campaigning season, Marlborough attempted to launch an invasion of France up the Moselle valley.  This effort was halted by a combination of supply shortages and an excellent French defensive position in front of Sierck, and Marlborough and his army were recalled by the Dutch States General when Marshall Villeroi attacked and took the fortress of Huy and threatened Liège.  Having rushed back to the Low Countries (and forcing Villeroi to retreat behind his defenses), Marlborough retook Huy, and then planned to break through the lines to bring Villeroi to battle.

Breakthrough
On the evening of 17 July Marlborough sent the Dutch troops under Marshal Overkirk in a feint southwards towards Namur, drawing Villeroi and 40,000 men after them.  Overnight he marched with his own English and Scottish troops northwards to the small village of Eliksem (Elixheim), and there broke through the lines without resistance. Early the next day, as Overkirk's men countermarched northwards to join with Marlborough, a French detachment attacked the small force of allied troops drawn up to the west of the lines, facing south.  Following a short but intense cavalry battle, in which Marlborough was often personally engaged, they were driven off, and Villeroi withdrew his army to the west, behind the river Dyle.

Aftermath
Unable to pursue the French with any vigour on the day of the battle due to the exhaustion of his men, who had marched all night and then fought an intense battle, Marlborough nonetheless still hoped to bring Villeroi to battle. He was frustrated in manoeuvering to the west of the lines in the month immediately following the breakthrough. A final effort in early August, using waggons loaded with supplies to remove his dependency on his lines of communication, while successful in forcing Villeroi's army to make a stand close to Waterloo, ultimately failed to bring about a battle due to the veto exercised by the Dutch Field Deputies, notably Slangenburg. The Dutch Field Deputies refused to approve the attack, because they believed that the 70,000 numbering French army was to well entrenched. The Duke was forced to content himself with the capture of the fortress of Leau and the levelling of the Lines of Brabant between Leau and the Meuse.

Notes

References
 
 
 
 

Elixheim
Elixheim
Elixheim
Elixheim
Elixheim
Elixheim
1705 in France
Battle
Battle
18th century in the Southern Netherlands